Allen Press is a printer and publisher of scientific, academic and scholarly journals as well as commercial trade publications. Founded by Harold Allen in 1935, the company is located in Lawrence, Kansas.

Journals

It is the publisher, amongst others, of the Journal of Parasitology (American Society of Parasitologists), Phycologia (International Phycological Society), and the Proceedings of the Biological Society of Washington (Biological Society of Washington).

External links

References 

Publishing companies of the United States
Publishing companies established in 1935
Companies based in Kansas
1935 establishments in Kansas
Academic publishing companies